Electronic Payment Services, commonly known as EPS, is an electronic payment system based in Hong Kong, Macau, and with limited acceptance in Shenzhen since it began operations in 1985. The service is provided by EPS Company (Hong Kong) Limited with currently over 30,000 acceptance locations.

System
In each retail location, a terminal is installed and is usually connected to the POS system of the retailer.  The terminal may also be independently connected to banks through the public phone system.

Transactions approved before the cut-off time are batched into a payment made directly to the retailer's account by the end of the business day.

Service

ATM card payment
EPS entails the simple use of an ATM card or a credit card with ATM capability issued by a member bank of the EPS, acting as a debit card. No application for the service is required.

The EPS device is a dual-unit device consisting of a removable card processor and a stationary base that serves as a charger and data link. Some retailers may use an integrated machine. In such situations, the customer inserts the card into the machine directly and waits for the retailer's acknowledgement before proceeding to the rest of the steps.

EasyCash service 
EasyCash allows card holders to withdraw cash at over 1,200 locations in Hong Kong upon a regular purchase by EPS. The cash withdrawal amount must be in units of $100, up to $500. EPS EasyCash service is a kind of cashback service.

EPS EasyCash service is available at Hong Kong based chain stores such as Gourmet, Great, IKEA, Mannings, MarketPlace, Massimo Dutti, Circle K, Oliver's, Parknshop, Taste, ThreeSixty, Vango, China Resources Vanguard (CRV), V'ole and Wellcome.

PPS 
PPS is a service which allows card holders to pay bills using the phone or the internet. To use the service, the card holder must swipe the ATM card or the credit card with ATM capability through a PPS terminal to create an account. Afterwards, the account may be used to pay bills either through the PPS hotline, website or the mobile application.

Members
Bank of China (Hong Kong) Limited
Bank of Communications, HK Branch
China Construction Bank (Asia)
China Merchants Bank Company Limited
Chiyu Banking Corporation Limited
Chong Hing Bank Limited
Citibank (Hong Kong) Limited
China CITIC Bank International Limited
Dah Sing Bank Limited
DBS Bank (Hong Kong) Limited
Fubon Bank (Hong Kong) Limited
Hang Seng Bank Limited
The Hongkong and Shanghai Banking Corporation (HSBC)
ICBC (Asia)
Mevas Bank Limited
Nanyang Commercial Bank Limited
Shanghai Commercial Bank Limited
Standard Chartered Bank (Hong Kong) Limited
The Bank of East Asia Limited
OCBC Wing Hang Bank Limited
CMB Wing Lung Bank Limited

See also
Payment by Phone Service (PPS)
Octopus card
Credit card
Economy of Hong Kong

References

External links
Official website  

Financial services companies established in 1984
Financial services companies of Hong Kong
Payment systems
Interbank networks